A few Icelandic sagas tell about kings that ruled in Kvenland.

Icelandic sagas
In Egils saga Faravid is directly said to be the "King of Kvenland". 

Two other sagas that mention Kvenland, Hversu Noregr byggðist and Orkneyinga saga, do not use that specific title. In Orkneyinga saga, Fornjót is said to be "a king".  It is stated that he "reigned over Gotland, which we now know as Finland and Kvenland" (Gotland is variously written 'Jotland').

Hversu Noregr byggðist has very similar usage for the title.  This time, the great-grandson of Fornjót (who is said to be "a man"), Snær, and his son Thorri are told to be kings. Kvenland now appears in relation to Thorri, of whom it is said that "he ruled over Gothland, Kvenland (Kænlandi), and Finland".  Fornjót's great-grandson Snær is also mentioned in Ynglingasaga, in relation to Finland. 

Many medieval texts discuss the lineages sprung from Fornjót and his descendants, Hlér, Logi and Kári, particularly the children of the latter's descendant, Thorri and his children, Gói, Nór and Gór – leading to the later rulers of Scandinavia; Nór being the eponymous father of Norway, blending into the lineages of the kings in Uppsala, the Ynglings of Sweden, which became the royal dynasty of Norway as King Harald Fairhair unified Norway, who subdued the earls power to elect high-kings and with force took control of the so-called petty kingdoms, forced those resisting this coagulating new form of economy about to be the dominant in most of Europe, feudalism, into exile. Both the Icelandic Commonwealth, Þjoðveldið and the Great Heathen Army need be seen in this context. The so-called petty kingdoms before the unified Norway, when Sweden still was a territorial marker, Sviþjoð, extending from the North Sea to the Black Sea, the Land of the Danes where not defined as Denmark until Carolingan times, even after that encompassing the extent of the Danegeld. The medieval texts mapping these lineages and legendary lands of Scandinavia include the following: 

Beowulf (8th – early 11th century); Íslendingabók (8th–10th century); Hyndluljóð (a Norse poem from c. 800–1000, often considered a part of the Poetic Edda, which was compiled later); Ynglingatal (early 10th century); Primary Chronicle (c. 1095); Historia Norvegiæ (late 12th century); Gesta Danorum (started in c. 1185, finished in c. 1216); Skáldskaparmál (c. 1220); Ynglinga saga (c. 1225); Orkneyinga Saga (c. 1230); Heimskringla (c. 1230); Hversu Noregr byggðist (oldest surviving transcript dates to 1387), and its appendage Ættartölur (1387). 

However, whether or not Fornjót and his immediate descendants were actual historical people has been debated. Kyösti Julku notes that no geographical errors have been found in the descriptions of the Orkneyinga Saga.  He asks why therefore the people described in the account should be considered not to have existed.

In other sources
As a name for a country or geographical region, the name Kvenland in that or close to that spelling seems to gradually have gone out of ordinary usage in the course of the late Middle Ages. In c. 1271, the Icelandic Annals uses the term Kven, stating the following: "Then Karelians (Kereliar) and Kvens (Kvænir) pillaged widely in Hålogaland (Hálogaland)." Mid-16th century Norwegian tax records too – the earliest available – mention Kvens.

As the earliest account written in Swedish, Eric's Chronicle, dates to the 14th century, no pre-14th-century Swedish references to "Kvenland" or "Kvens" are therefore available. In the mid-16th century, the Swedish cartographer Olaus Magnus uses both terms, Kvens and Kvenland, marking for instance the name Birkarl Kvens (Berkara Qvenar) in his map in 1539.

Title of Charles IX of Sweden

In 1604 Swedes founded a castle named Cajanaborg on an island on the Kajaani river (the ruins of the castle are now the center of Kajaani, the capital of the Kainuu region).

Shortly afterwards, in 1607, King Charles IX of Sweden called himself the ruler of – among other peoples – the "Caijaners". In the view of Kyösti Julku and many other historians, Caijaners, a Swedish name for the inhabitants of Kainuu, is here equivalent to the Old Norse kvenir. According to many historians, the term Kven, the Swedish term Caijaner, and the Finnic term kainulainen/kainuulainen are synonyms, meaning same in different languages. Charles IX's claim can thus be seen as "king of the Kvens".

That year, 1607, King Charles IX of Sweden expanded his already lengthy title to be as follows:
"Carl then nijonde, Sweriges, Göthes, Wendes, Finnars, Carelers, Lappers i Nordlanden, the Caijaners och Esters i Lifland, etc. Konung" (Translation from Swedish to English: "Charles IX, King of the Swedes, Goths, Wends, Finns, Karelians, Lapps in the Northland, the Caijanians, and Estonians in Livonia, etc.").

Charles IX's son Gustavus Adolphus of Sweden dropped the term "Lappers j Nordlanden, the Caijaners" from the title in 1611, when he succeeded his father as king, and that term was not added back nor similar wording was included later.

See also
 Birkarls

References 

Finnish monarchy
Kven
Kings in Norse mythology and legends